The Belle Fourche River (pronounced bel FOOSH) is a tributary of the Cheyenne River, approximately  long, in the U.S. states of Wyoming and South Dakota. It is part of the Mississippi River watershed via the Cheyenne and Missouri rivers. In the latter part of the 19th century, the Belle Fourche River was known as the North Fork of the Cheyenne River. Belle Fourche is a name derived from French meaning "beautiful fork".

Description
It flows northeast around the north side of the Bear Lodge Mountains, past Moorcroft and Devils Tower. Near the state line with Montana, it turns abruptly southeast and flows in western South Dakota, past Belle Fourche and around the north side of the Black Hills. In southern Meade County near Hereford, it turns ENE and joins the Cheyenne approximately  ENE of Rapid City.

This is the second-highest low point of any U.S. state. At Elm Springs, the river has an average discharge of 

The river provides significant recreation and irrigation for agriculture in western South Dakota.

See also

 List of rivers of South Dakota
 List of rivers of Wyoming

References

External links

 

Devils Tower National Monument
Rivers of South Dakota
Rivers of Wyoming
Rivers of Meade County, South Dakota
Rivers of Butte County, South Dakota
Rivers of Campbell County, Wyoming
Rivers of Crook County, Wyoming
Tributaries of the Missouri River